Martin Weisz (born March 27, 1966), is a German music video and film director. He has directed over 350 videos and worked with artists such as Nickelback, Brandy, Puff Daddy, and LL Cool J. He has also directed numerous commercials.

Martin Weisz won an MTV Europe Music Award for Best Dance Video and was nominated for Best Rock Video in 2000.

He made his debut as a film director with the controversial 2006 film Rohtenburg (called Grimm Love in the United States), which is banned in some areas of Germany.
His second film, The Hills Have Eyes 2, debuted in theaters in 2007. His third film, Squatters, debuted in theaters on May 13, 2014.

Martin Weisz is married and has four children.

References

External links 
 
 Official homepage of Martin Weisz

1966 births
Living people
Film directors from Berlin
German music video directors